The Layover is a 2017 American sex comedy film directed by William H. Macy and written by David Hornsby and Lance Krall, starring Alexandra Daddario, Kate Upton, Matt Barr, Matt L. Jones, Rob Corddry, Kal Penn, and Molly Shannon. Filming began early May 2015 in Vancouver, British Columbia, and was completed early June 2015.

The film was released on August 3, 2017, through DirecTV Cinema, and then began a limited release and playing video on demand on September 1, 2017, by Vertical Entertainment.

Plot 
Kate and Meg are childhood friends and roommates in Seattle experiencing stressful times. Kate is a high school English teacher who is being pressured by Principal Moss to resign, while Meg is a struggling cosmetics saleswoman. After a night of drinking, Meg suggests they go on vacation together to escape their stressful lives. Kate is reluctant, but ultimately acquiesces as Meg had already booked non-refundable tickets to Fort Lauderdale using Kate's frequent flyer miles.

On the plane, Kate and Meg are seated next to Ryan, a handsome firefighter on his way to a wedding. Both women are immediately attracted to him and begin to shamelessly flirt with him. A few hours into the flight, the plane is diverted to St. Louis due to a hurricane warning. The women are taken to the local Sheraton and run into Ryan, who invites them to drinks at the hotel club. Before going to bed, Kate tells Meg that she will fight her for Ryan's affections.

When it is learned the hurricane will move away from Florida, Ryan manages to get a ride from Craig, a jewelry salesman who had taken a liking to Meg but had been continually rebuffed by her, and the women ask to tag along. Kate shows embarrassing childhood photos of Meg to the men for their amusement and in response, Meg locks Kate in a gas station bathroom, forcing Kate to escape through a high window covered in feces. Back in the car, Kate fakes an injury to get a massage from Ryan, prompting Meg to place sleeping pills into a bottle of wine to give to Kate. When Kate declines to drink, Craig, who is driving, takes it instead, much to Meg's horror. After a few hours, Craig eventually passes out and crashes the car, forcing the four to spend the night at a motel.

When Kate sees the pills in the bottle, she asks for a hotel room for herself. Meg says that she can have Ryan, but Kate proclaims she never wanted Ryan and merely did not want Meg to have him. Meg decides to go to a local bar where Craig joins her. When Craig fails to impress Meg, he suggests to her that she should be open to the qualities of other men. Back at the hotel, Ryan makes a pass at Kate, who gives in and has rigorous sex with him. In the morning at breakfast, Meg tells Kate they should not jeopardize their friendship over a man, but when Meg lets slip that Ryan has a misshaped penis, something Kate had seen from having sex with him, Kate realizes Meg had sex with Ryan as well and the two get into a physical fight, making a mess of the motel lobby in the process. Their fight ends when the motel manager calls the police on them.

Craig reveals to the police that Ryan had taken his car to reach the wedding on time. When he looks up Ryan's Google Plus profile, he sees that Ryan is the one getting married, revealing this to the women. Appalled, they beg to be released to stop the wedding, and are let go after paying for the damage to the lobby. The two arrive at the hotel in Fort Lauderdale where the wedding is taking place, but it is too late to stop it. The women confront Ryan, who calls them out on throwing themselves at him. The women still claim it was wrong for him to sleep with both of them the night before his wedding and not tell them he was the one being married. Ryan admits he had been with his now-wife Genevieve since freshman year of college and has not been able to get with anyone else. When the women meet Genevieve, they see that she is controlling and demanding of Ryan, and decide not to tell her about his actions, feeling Ryan will suffer enough in his marriage. With a few hours before their flight back to Seattle, Meg tracks down Craig at his jewelry shop to apologize for brushing him off, kissing him before she leaves. At the airport, Meg tells Kate that they should not live together anymore, to which Kate tearfully agrees, as they have been too dependent on each other.

Kate returns to her job with renewed vigor, and she requests of Principal Moss that her students be allowed to indulge their creativity more instead of just following the standard curriculum. Moss reveals to Kate that he had no intention of firing her; he actually wants to offer her the assistant volleyball coach position. Meg starts taking classes and is in a long-distance relationship with Craig. Meanwhile, Meg has moved into an apartment only a few doors down from Kate so the two can still be close.

Cast 
 Alexandra Daddario as Kate Jeffries, a high school teacher and Meg's best friend
 Kate Upton as Meg, a businesswoman and Kate's best friend
 Matt Barr as Ryan, the object of Kate and Meg's affection
 Matt L. Jones as Craig
 Rob Corddry as Principal Stan Moss, Kate's boss and apparent nemesis
 Kal Penn as Anuj, a hotel manager
 Molly Shannon as Nancy
 Jennifer Cheon as Genevieve
 Eric Gibson as Demarius
 Carrie Genzel as buyer

Production 
On March 25, 2015, it was announced that William H. Macy would direct and star in a road-trip sex comedy film, titled The Layover, scripted by David Hornsby and Lance Krall. Keith Kjarval would produce through Unified Pictures, along with Aaron L. Gilbert through Bron Studios. Lea Michele and Kate Upton were cast to play best friends who decide to take a vacation to avoid their problems. On April 24, 2015, TheWrap revealed that Alexandra Daddario joined the film; she replaced Michele after she left the project. Rob Corddry, Kal Penn and Matt Barr were confirmed for the cast on May 7, 2015, and Matt L. Jones was also added. Macy ultimately did not appear in the film.

Filming began in the first week of May 2015 in Vancouver, British Columbia, and wrapped in the second week of June 2015.

Release 
The film debuted on DirecTV Cinema on August 3, 2017, followed by a limited release through Vertical Entertainment on September 1, 2017.

Reception 
Review aggregation website Rotten Tomatoes gives the film an approval rating of 0%, based on reviews from 18 critics, with an average rating of 2.1/10. On Metacritic, it has a score of 15 out of 100 based on 7 reviews, indicating an "overwhelming dislike".

Ben Kenigsberg, writing for The New York Times, states that the film is just about fighting over a man. Richard Roeper, writing for Chicago Sun-Times, compared the movie to the unpleasantness of enduring a layover at O'Hare International Airport, decried the performance of Upton, and expressed surprise that Macy could be responsible for directing such "an unholy mess".

References

External links 
 
 The Layover at Bron Studios
 
 
 
 

2017 films
2017 comedy films
2010s American films
2010s buddy comedy films
2010s comedy road movies
2010s English-language films
2010s female buddy films
2010s sex comedy films
American buddy comedy films
American comedy road movies
American female buddy films
American sex comedy films
Bron Studios films
Casual sex in films
Films about educators
Films about vacationing
Films directed by William H. Macy
Films set in Florida
Films set in Seattle
Films set in St. Louis
Films shot in Florida
Films shot in Missouri
Films shot in Vancouver
Fort Lauderdale, Florida
Vertical Entertainment films